Rēzija Kalniņa (born 23 December 1970) is a Latvian actress. In the theater, since 1994, she has worked for Dailes Theatre. She has also taken part in several films.
Her parents are the Latvian composer Imants Kalniņš and the actor and director Helga Dancberga.

In 2001, she received the Lielais Kristaps award for her role in Good Hands.

Filmography

References

External links

Rēzija Kalniņa at the Dailes Theatre homepage

1970 births
Living people
Latvian stage actresses
Latvian film actresses
Latvian television actresses
Lielais Kristaps Award winners
Actors from Riga
20th-century Latvian actresses
21st-century Latvian actresses